Thomas Bihl (born 1975) is a German poker player who became the first person to win a World Series of Poker bracelet outside Las Vegas, Nevada.  Bihl was sponsored by Betfair, the official sponsor of the 2007 World Series of Poker Europe (WSOPE).

His bracelet win came in a HORSE event. Bihl defeated Jennifer Harman heads-up after Harman raised all-in with two pair. Bihl had an open-ended straight and flush draw. He hit his straight on the river, winning the inaugural WSOPE event.

As of 2008, his live tournament winnings approximately $370,000.

World Series of Poker bracelets

An "E" following a year denotes bracelet(s) won at the World Series of Poker Europe

References

External links
 

1975 births
German poker players
World Series of Poker bracelet winners
Living people